Supreme Electoral Tribunal may refer to:

 Supreme Electoral Tribunal of Bolivia
 Superior Electoral Court, Brazil
 Supreme Electoral Court of Costa Rica
 Supreme Electoral Court (El Salvador)
 Supreme Electoral Tribunal (Guatemala)
 Supreme Electoral Tribunal (Honduras)

See also
 Supreme Electoral Court (disambiguation)